Brick Chapel Church and Cemetery is a historic Presbyterian church and cemetery located at Canton in St. Lawrence County, New York. The church was built in 1858 for the local Methodist congregation, who merged with the Presbyterians in the 1910s.  It is a 40 feet by 56 feet brick structure resting on a raised ashlar limestone foundation.  It features a large, square engaged bell tower on the front facade.  Also on the property is a cemetery with burials dating to 1809.

It was listed on the National Register of Historic Places in 2005.

References

Churches completed in 1858
19th-century Presbyterian church buildings in the United States
Churches on the National Register of Historic Places in New York (state)
Georgian architecture in New York (state)
Churches in St. Lawrence County, New York
National Register of Historic Places in St. Lawrence County, New York
1858 establishments in New York (state)